Zahlé is the capital and the largest city of Beqaa Governorate, Lebanon. With around 150,000 inhabitants, it is the third-largest city in Lebanon after Beirut and Tripoli and the fourth largest taking the whole urban area (the Jounieh urban area is larger).

Zahlé is known as the "Bride of the Beqaa" and "the Neighbor of the Gorge" for its geographical location and attractiveness, but also as "the City of Wine and Poetry". It is famous throughout Lebanon and the region for its pleasant climate, numerous riverside restaurants and quality arak. Its inhabitants are predominantly Melkite Greek Catholic and are known in Arabic as Zahlawi.

Etymology 

The occasional landslides that take place on deforested hills around the town are probably at the origin of the name.

History
There has been human activity in the area for at least five thousand years. In the 18th century, Zahlé was a small village of some 200 houses. Its relative geographic isolation from the local centres of power in Mount Lebanon and Syria caused the village not to have any significant allies in the region to fall back on in case of conflicts or attacks. Zahlé was burned in 1777 and 1791.

Tradition holds that many Christians quit the Baalbek region in the 18th century for the newer, more secure town of Zahlé on account of the Harfush dynasty's oppression and rapacity, but more critical studies have questioned that interpretation by pointing out that the dynasty was closely allied to the Orthodox Ma'luf family of Zahlé (where Mustafa Harfush took refuge some years later) and showing that depredations from various quarters as well as Zahlé's growing commercial attractiveness accounted for Baalbek's decline in the 18th century. What repression there was did not always target the Christian community per se. The Shiite 'Usayran family, for example, is also said to have left Baalbek then to avoid expropriation by the Harfushes and established itself as one of the premier commercial households of Sidon and later even served as consuls of Iran.

At the end of the 18th century, Zahlé had one thousand inhabitants and two hundred houses. By 1820, Zahlé's population had grown to 5,000. By 1850 it was 7,000 to 8,000 and the town had become the commercial centre for the Beka'a and main depot for the local grain harvest. Some of the factors for the expansion included the Egyptian Occupation (1831–41), which lead to the opening of the country to European trade, the Crimean War which had caused grain shortages in Europe and the expansion of silk production in Mount Lebanon.

On 7 September 1985, during the civil war, the Lebanese Forces militia, at that time led by Elie Hobeika agreed to 100 Syrian soldiers and 20 intelligence officers taking up strategic positions in the town.

Besides controlling the grain trade Zahlé became a centre for livestock from Greater Syria and produced leather, woven and dyed goods, trading with Aleppo, Damascus and Beirut. By the 1860s and 1870s the local merchants were prosperous but were still dependent on banks in Beirut for credit for their transactions.

The current population is not accurately known, since no census has been conducted in Lebanon since 1932, but a sensible estimate gives 60,000 people in the town proper, making it the country's fourth largest. (The locals tend to give figures of 200,000 or 300,000 inhabitants, which, however, are misleading and completely unrealistic.) The urban area includes the neighbouring towns of Saadnayel, Taalabaya, Chtaura and Jdita to the southwest, which have come to form a single urban entity since the late 1990s due to unplanned growth, and is home to about 100,000 people. The metropolitan area extends over much of the Zahlé District and additionally comprises:
 the town of Kab Elias to the southwest
 the town of Bar Elias to the south
 the villages of Furzol, Ablah and Niha to the northeast
 and the towns of Riyaq, Haoush Hala and Ali en Nahri to the east
with a total population close to 200,000.

Demographics

Zahlé is the largest predominantly Christian town in Lebanon and the Middle East (with Christians forming around 90% of its total population) and the one with the largest number of Catholics. While several Middle Eastern cities (including Damascus, Cairo and Amman) have larger Christian communities, these do not constitute a majority. In Lebanon, Beirut also has a larger Christian population than Zahlé (in the city proper), but most of this population belongs to the Greek Orthodox confession.

The Christian population of Zahlé has the following approximate composition:
 65% Melkite Greek Catholic
 15% Maronite
 10% Greek Orthodox
 10% belonging to various minorities, most notably the Syriac Orthodox

Only two Muslim families remained inside Zahlé during the civil war: Hindi and Zrein. Zahlé's Muslim minority (around 17% of the population) is concentrated in the neighborhoods of Karak Nuh (where Noah's tomb is allegedly located) and Haoush al-Umara, specifically, in an area named "Hay al-watani", on the northeastern and southwestern edge of town, respectively. Sixty-two percent of Muslims in the area are Shia, while the remaining 38% are Sunnis. In the past the town also had a Druze minority and even a small Jewish population, most of which, however, emigrated during the Lebanese Civil War.

Zahlé has been a land of emigration since the early 20th century, with most people emigrating to South America, mainly Colombia, Venezuela, Brazil and Argentina. During the civil war in the 1970s and 1980s, a new flow of migrants left the town for the United States, Canada, Australia and Brazil. In recent years, emigration has continued, with Canada and the United Arab Emirates being the main destinations. Today, an estimated 250,000 people of local descent live abroad, most of them in Colombia and Brazil.

Economy 

Being the main town of the Beqaa Valley, Lebanon's most important agricultural region, the economy of Zahlé has long been built on agriculture. Grapes are the area's chief product, with vineyards forming a prominent feature of the surrounding landscape. Vines are also individually grown on lattice, on many of the older houses' terraces. A sizable part of the local produce supplies the three wineries present in and around the town, and the numerous distilleries producing arak, the local liquor which Zahlé is famous for.

Zahlé saw at a time a prosperous commercial activity due to its location midway between Beirut and Damascus. Paradoxically, it regained some of that activity during the civil war, when the growing instability in Beirut led to a decentralization of the economy. Furthermore, taxation was nonexistent due to the collapse of State authority, which Zahlé took advantage of to expand its industrial and commercial sectors. The town's main industrial area lies to the southeast, with the chief sectors being paper mills, chemicals, plastics, canning and food processing.

A number of companies and state bodies have their headquarters for the Beqaa region in Zahlé, including the Central Bank of Lebanon and the Lebanese Chamber of Commerce.

Education
Zahlé is evolving into a regional center of higher education, after many universities have opened branches there in recent years. Institutes of higher education currently represented in the town include:
 Lebanese University
 Saint Joseph University
 Holy Spirit University of Kaslik
 Antonine University
 American University of Science and Technology
 The National Technical Institute

Transportation 

Zahlé is connected to Beirut ( to the west), and from there to all coastal cities, through the Beirut-Damascus road, which passes to the southwest of the urban area. The journey can take anywhere from 45 minutes to 2 hours, depending on the traffic. Despite continuously undergoing works and repairs, the Beirut-Damascus road remains in poor condition, and is due to be replaced by a new, multimillion-dollar highway as the main international route; however, the completion date is still unclear.

Zahlé is also connected to Baalbek ( to the northeast) by the trans-Beqaa road, which continues further north towards Homs, Syria. The section stretching along the Zahlé urban area (from Chtaura to Karak Nuh) was recently upgraded.

Due to widespread car ownership, public transportation remains underdeveloped. There is a single bus line, which runs on the central avenue at rather irregular times. Interurban transportation is done by minivans, which stop on the Manara roundabout at the town's entrance. Zahlé's railway station was located in Muallaqa, but was abandoned after all rail transport in Lebanon stopped during the civil war.

A regional airport could prove vital when the road to Beirut is closed because of heavy snowfall. However, the project froze in the early 2000s, after the runway extension had been initiated.

Main sights

Berdawni Promenade 

The banks of the Berdawni River have long been a place where people of Zahlé and other parts of Lebanon  come to socialize. The town's most popular attraction is a  promenade along the river, referred to as "Al Wadi" ("the valley"). Sheltered between the ravine's limestone cliffs, it is lined up with large outdoor restaurants, cafes and playrooms, and shaded by trees. These restaurants specialize in traditional Lebanese meze served with arak. The promenade is closed during late fall and winter, when cold winds from the mountain sweep through the ravine.

Our Lady of Zahlé and Bekaa 

Located on a hilltop to the southwest of Zahlé, this is a  concrete tower, entirely clad in white marble, and topped with a  bronze statue of the Virgin Mary, the work of an Italian artist. It is by far Zahlé's most prominent structure—visible from most of the city and from several miles around in the central Bekaa Valley. At its base is a chapel that can seat a little over a hundred people. The top of the tower features sweeping views over Zahlé and the Bekaa Valley.

Town Hall (Old Serail) 

This Ottoman building was constructed in 1850 to serve as the town's Serail. Located just downhill from Our Lady of Zahlé and Bekaa, it is a mix of local and Ottoman architecture, and features an atrium occupied by an inner garden and surrounded by arcades. Though still known as "the Old Serail", it currently serves as the Town Hall. In the past, the ground floor used to house the local prison, which suffered of severe overcrowding and substandard conditions. The prison was transferred in 2009 to a new location in Muallaqa, with room for about 800 inmates and much more adequate infrastructure.

The Catholic Cathedral (Our Lady of Salvation) 
This grandiose complex dates back to 1720, and consists of a series of stone-clad buildings around a large inner courtyard: the church itself (which is the oldest part), the seat of the Archbishop (a converted former monastery), and a small chapel housing an icon, which is said to be a reproduction of a portrait of the Virgin Mary by Saint Lucas. It also features a monumental entrance, an underground cemetery, and a  bell tower, atop of which a large marble clock was mounted in 1993. Part of the complex was destroyed by a bomb attack in April 1987, and rebuilt ever since.

Grand Hotel Kadri 
The grand Hotel Kadri is a prime example of the traditional stone architecture of Zahlé, both in and out. It has long been used by most officials and dignitaries visiting the town, as its largest and most luxurious hotel. The Ottomans converted it to a hospital during World War I. During the Lebanese Civil War, it was occupied by Syrian troops and sustained enormous damage. An ambitious restoration project in the mid-1990s was able to bring it back to its former glory. The hotel closed in February 2011 due to a conflict between its direction and the Catholic Church (its effective owner since 1999) and reopened later in 2013.

Memshieh Park 
Situated across the street from Grand Hotel Kadri, Memshieh is Zahlé's oldest and shadiest park (newly opened J.T.Skaff Park is larger, but contains considerably fewer trees). The park houses a collection of marble tables with mosaic depictions of several sites in Lebanon, a small pond with waterlilies, a semi-circular marble tholos, and several sculptures representing famous locals. In 2003, the municipality covered a  fir (the park's tallest) with thousands of lights, in an attempt to break the world record for the largest natural Christmas tree.

Archaeological sites 
Zahlé in itself offers little archaeological interest; however, the Château Ksara winery is worth a visit for its maze of vaults which dates back to Roman times. The suburb of Karak Nuh also features a curiosity: a  stone structure inside the local mosque, which local tradition believes to be the Tomb of Noah (but is probably a section of a Roman aqueduct).

Furthermore, there are several ancient sites of interest in nearby locations:
 In Qabb Ilyas ( to the southwest): rock sculptures of three deities that seem to be of Roman origin
 In Anjar ( to the south): the unique ruins of an Umayyad palace built following a Roman layout, using recycled Hellenistic and Roman material. The palace is classified as a World Heritage Site. A Roman temple also stands on a hilltop above nearby Majdel Anjar.
 Above the village of Furzol ( to the northwest): a series of rock-cut Roman tombs in the limestone cliffs
 In Niha ( to the northwest): two exquisite Roman temples bearing Phoenician architectural elements (just outside the village), and two others in need of restoration (higher up, in the area referred to as "the Fortress").
Two more sites worth visiting are a more distant trip away:
 Kamed al Lawz ( to the south) is the most important Bronze Age settlement in Lebanon, with finds from the Phoenician, Persian, Hellenistic, Roman and Byzantine periods having been uncovered as well.

Culture 
Zahlé's culture has long revolved around its signature crop, the grape, and its products, wine and arak. Arak, in particular, has traditionally been served in cafés at virtually any time of the day. The city is known as "the City of Wine and Poetry". A graceful personification of this nickname stands at the town's entrance: a statue of Erato, the muse of love poetry, holding a bunch of grapes.

Zahlé's most important cultural event is the "Festival of the Vine", traditionally held each September, during which concerts, plays, poetry evenings and artistic exhibitions are organized daily over the course of two or three weeks. The final Saturday evening features the crowning of the "Maid of the Vine", the local beauty queen, and the next afternoon, the festival closes with arguably its most popular event: a parade of floats held on the town's main avenue. The floats are entirely decorated with flowers according to a central theme.

The other central aspect of the local culture is religious devotion. Zahlé is still a very Catholic and conservative town, and many of its inhabitants display a pride with their religious identity. In particular, it is customary to pay visits to seven churches on Good Friday. Holidays also endorse a very social character, being a time to visit friends and relatives.

Prophet Elias (Elijah) is the town's patron saint, whose feast on July 20 is traditionally celebrated with fireworks. Another notable holiday is Corpus-Christi, celebrated on the first Thursday of June with a large-scale procession, with a torch-lit parade being held on the previous evening. The Corpus Christi celebration dates back to 1825, when the town was spared the ravages of bubonic plague.

Climate 
Zahlé has a Mediterranean climate (Köppen climate classification: Csa) with continental influences.

Notable natives 
 Said Akl, poet, philosopher and politician
 Fouad El Turk, poet, former Lebanese ambassador to the United Nations and head of the Forum of Lebanese Ambassadors
 Charles Elachi (from nearby Riyaq), director of the Jet Propulsion Laboratory in NASA
 Elias Hrawi, president of Lebanon 1989–1998
 Joseph Raya, Melkite Greek Catholic archbishop and civil rights activist
 Louis Khalil, Lebanese priest of the Maronite Church
 Najwa Karam, Lebanese singer
 Wael Kfoury, Lebanese singer
 Isabel Bayrakdarian, Armenian-Canadian operatic soprano
 Karl Sharro, Lebanese-Iraqi architect and writer based in London 
 .
 Mário Zagallo, Brazilian footballer and manager who won three FIFA World Cup with Brazil, and is of Lebanese ancestry from Zahlé

Twin towns – sister cities
Zahlé is twinned with:

 Baalbek, Lebanon
 Belo Horizonte, Brazil
 Bordeaux, France, since 2006
 Recife, Brazil
 Rosario, Argentina
 Zabrze, Poland

References

 View From Zahle: Security And Economic Conditions In The Central Bekaa 1980-1985
 
 on Lebanon and the Peace Process, "Bashir Gemeyel and Syria Fight Over Zahle"
 Conflict and Consensus, "Zahlé and Dayr Al-Qamar, two market towns during the civil war of the 1860s."
 "Zahlé and Forzol"
 Dictionary of the Names of Towns and Villages in Lebanon, Anis Freiha, 1976

External links

 mideast.com/zahle
 tourism
 Zahleh - Maallaqa - Taanayel, localiban.org

  

Archaeological sites in Lebanon
Christian cities in Lebanon
Melkite Christian communities in Lebanon
Populated places in Zahlé District
Tourism in Lebanon
Tourist attractions in Lebanon